A by-election was held for the New South Wales Legislative Assembly seat of Murray on 13 September 1980. It was triggered by the death of Mary Meillon. The seat had not been contested by the Country party since 1973 as the Coalition agreement prohibited the party from endorsing candidates to run against sitting Liberals. The 1980 redistribution would see the district of Sturt abolished, and much of the district included in the Murray. Tim Fischer (Country) was the member for Sturt and resigned to contest the by-election.

By-elections for the seats of Bankstown and Ku-ring-gai were held on the same day.

Dates

Result 

Mary Meillon died..<noinclude>

See also
Electoral results for the district of Murray
List of New South Wales state by-elections

References 

1980 elections in Australia
New South Wales state by-elections
1980s in New South Wales